This is a list of films produced in Brazil in 1964.

See also
1964 in Brazil

External links
Brazilian films of 1964 at the Internet Movie Database

Brazil
1964
Films